Wind Lake is a census-designated place (CDP) in Racine County, Wisconsin, United States. The population was 5,355 at the 2020 census.  Wind Lake is in the town of Norway.

Geography
Wind Lake is located at  (42.821952, -88.157810).

According to the United States Census Bureau, the CDP has a total area of 7.3 square miles (18.8 km), of which, 5.4 square miles (14.0 km) of it is land and 1.8 square miles (4.8 km) of it (25.43%) is water.

Demographics

At the 2000 census there were 5,202 people, 1,817 households, and 1,466 families in the CDP. The population density was 986.5 people per square mile (381.1/km). There were 1,933 housing units at an average density of 366.6/sq mi (141.6/km).  The racial makeup of the CDP was 98.15% White, 0.31% African American, 0.35% Native American, 0.25% Asian, 0.06% Pacific Islander, 0.31% from other races, and 0.58% from two or more races. Hispanic or Latino of any race were 1.69%.

Of the 1,817 households 42.3% had children under the age of 18 living with them, 70.6% were married couples living together, 6.5% had a female householder with no husband present, and 19.3% were non-families. 14.5% of households were one person and 4.7% were one person aged 65 or older. The average household size was 2.86 and the average family size was 3.19.

The age distribution was 29.5% under the age of 18, 5.7% from 18 to 24, 33.9% from 25 to 44, 23.0% from 45 to 64, and 7.9% 65 or older. The median age was 36 years. For every 100 females, there were 103.8 males. For every 100 females age 18 and over, there were 102.8 males.

The median household income was $68,378 and the median family income  was $74,497. Males had a median income of $46,596 versus $31,716 for females. The per capita income for the CDP was $24,765. About 1.1% of families and 3.4% of the population were below the poverty line, including 2.2% of those under age 18 and 2.0% of those age 65 or over.

References

External links
 https://dnr.wi.gov/lakes/lakepages/LakeDetail.aspx?wbic=761700
 Wind Lake, Wisconsin Chamber of Commerce 

Census-designated places in Racine County, Wisconsin
Census-designated places in Wisconsin